Lihpao Resort is a theme park located in Houli District, Taichung, Taiwan.

It currently has two roller coasters, including Gravity Max, the world's first coaster to feature a true 90-degree drop and the world's first tilt coaster. Besides Gravity Max, Lihpao Land has several themed areas with varied attractions, such as the Mine Express roller coaster, the Hook (a pirate ship ride), and the Wild Flume Adventure, a reversing log flume attraction.

History
The site where the theme park sits today used to be a ranch owned by Taiwan Sugar Corporation. The theme park was originally established in July 1998 as Yamay Recreation World or Yamay Discovery World. It was renamed to Lihpao Land in 2012.

Architecture

 Discovery Walk
 D Street
 Enchanted Forest
 Fairy Tale Village
 Palace of Dreams
 Yamay Island
 Sky Dream - Taiwan's tallest ferris wheel, at

Transportation
The theme park is accessible by bus from Fengyuan Station of Taiwan Railways.

See also
 List of tourist attractions in Taiwan

References

External links

 

1998 establishments in Taiwan
Amusement parks in Taiwan
Amusement parks opened in 1998
Buildings and structures in Taichung
Tourist attractions in Taichung